is a Japanese badminton player. Together with Shizuka Yamamoto, she won the women's doubles national champion in 2000 and 2003. Yamada competed in badminton at the 2004 Summer Olympics in women's doubles with partner Shizuka Yamamoto. They were defeated by Chin Eei Hui and Wong Pei Tty of Malaysia in the round of 32. She is currently ranked #7 in Japan.

Achievements

IBF World Championships 
Women's doubles

BWF International Challenge/Series (2 titles, 4 runners-up)
Women's doubles

 BWF International Challenge tournament
 BWF International Series tournament

References

External links
 

1978 births
Living people
Sportspeople from Toyama Prefecture
Japanese female badminton players
Badminton players at the 2004 Summer Olympics
Olympic badminton players of Japan
Badminton players at the 2002 Asian Games
Asian Games competitors for Japan